Local elections are scheduled to be held in Northern Ireland on 18 May 2023, 2 weeks after other elections across the United Kingdom. The last local elections in Northern Ireland were held in 2019.

The elections were delayed by 2 weeks to avoid overlapping with the coronation of King Charles III.

Electoral system 
Northern Ireland uses the single transferable vote (STV) electoral system to elect members of local councils and members of the Northern Ireland Assembly. Voters rank candidates in order of preference by marking 1, 2, 3, etc. to the names of candidates on a ballot paper and can rank as many or as few candidates as they like or just vote for one candidate. These were the third elections held on new boundaries, introduced in 2014.

These are the second Northern Irish elections and the first local election at which people are able to register to vote online.

Background 
This election is being held after the 2022 Northern Ireland Assembly election, where, for the first time, Sinn Féin became the biggest political party in the Assembly and was the first time that the Democratic Unionist Party (DUP) didn't assume the position of First Minister-designate since 2007. Due to the terms outlined in the Good Friday Agreement, the largest nationalist party and the largest unionist party must be in government together. However, the Executive, Northern Ireland's government, isn't currently sitting. This is because the DUP has refused to enter government due to the Northern Ireland Protocol, an agreement between the European Union (EU) and the United Kingdom (UK) that governs the unique customs and immigration issues at the border between Republic of Ireland and Northern Ireland. This move has proved controversial, with the Vice President of Sinn Féin and First Minister-designate, Michelle O'Neill saying that it's "totally unacceptable" for the DUP to refuse to enter the Executive amid a crisis. The Social Democratic and Labour Party (SDLP) has accused the DUP of treating voters with contempt and "making our electoral process look like a bad joke" and Naomi Long, leader of the Alliance Party, said DUP Assembly Members should not be allowed to claim their salary while they prevented the Assembly from functioning.

Notes

References 

2023 in Northern Ireland
2023 United Kingdom local elections
Council elections in Northern Ireland